Ayrton Lucas Dantas de Medeiros (born 19 June 1997), known as Ayrton Lucas or just Ayrton, is a Brazilian footballer who plays for Flamengo as a left back.

Club career

Fluminense
Born in Carnaúba dos Dantas, Ayrton Lucas started his youth career with the academy of ABC Futebol Clube and joined the academy of Fluminense in October 2014. On 8 August 2015, he was promoted to the senior team. However, he soon lost his position to Léo Pelé and Giovanni and was subsequently loaned out to Madureira on 23 February 2016 for the Campeonato Carioca. In April, he returned to his parent club.

On 4 January 2017, Ayrton Lucas was loaned out to Londrina. Twenty-five days later, he made his first team debut in a 1–1 draw against Prudentópolis. On 13 April, he scored his first goal for the club in a 3–0 victory against Rio Branco. Londrina went on to win the Primeira Liga, with Ayrton Lucas finding the net during the penalty shoot-out in the final against Atlético Mineiro.

After returning from loan, Ayrton Lucas was included in the Fluminense squad for the 2018 Florida Cup. He was issued the number 6 jersey for the Série A season.

Spartak Moscow
On 17 December 2018, Ayrton Lucas signed a long-term contract with Russian club Spartak Moscow. He scored his first goal for Spartak against FC Tambov on 26 September 2020. He followed up with his second in the same match and led the team to a 2–0 win.

On 19 January 2022, he extended his contract with Spartak until May 2026.

Flamengo
On 31 March 2022, Ayrton Lucas joined Flamengo on loan until the end of 2022, with a conditional obligation to buy.

In 2022 Ayrton Lucas had the best season of his career winning Copa do Brail and Copa Libertadores with a total of six assists and two goals in 41 appearances for Flamengo.

On 16 December 2022, Flamengo announced the permanent transfer of Ayrton Lucas with a €7m transfer fee, he signed a contract with the club until December 2027.

International career
In April 2016, Ayrton Lucas was called to the under-20 national team for the Suwon JS Cup.

Career statistics

Honours
Londrina
Primeira Liga: 2017
Spartak Moscow
Russian Cup: 2021–22
Flamengo
Copa Libertadores: 2022
Copa do Brasil: 2022

References

1997 births
Living people
Sportspeople from Rio Grande do Norte
Brazilian footballers
Association football defenders
Campeonato Brasileiro Série A players
Campeonato Brasileiro Série B players
Fluminense FC players
Madureira Esporte Clube players
Londrina Esporte Clube players
FC Spartak Moscow players
CR Flamengo footballers
Copa Libertadores-winning players
Russian Premier League players
Brazilian expatriate footballers
Expatriate footballers in Russia
Brazilian expatriate sportspeople in Russia